Smyrna meatballs, known as soutzoukakia Smyrneika or İzmir köfte (Turkish), is a Greek and Turkish dish of spicy oblong meatballs with cumin and garlic served in tomato sauce. This dish was brought to Greece by refugees from Asia Minor.

The Greek version is typically made with minced meat (usually beef, also mixed with lamb or pork), bread crumbs, egg, garlic, and parsley, and generously spiced with cumin, cinnamon, salt, and pepper. They are floured before being fried in olive oil. The tomato sauce has tomato, wine, onion, garlic, a bayleaf, salt and pepper, and olive oil. Soutzoukakia are generally served with pilaf or mashed potatoes.

Name

The Turkish name  means köfte (meatballs) from İzmir, formerly Smyrna.

The Greek name  means spicy little sausages (Turkish sucuk + Greek diminutive -) from Smyrna. Soutzoukakia can sometimes refer to the same cylindrical meatballs when grilled (like köfte kebab) rather than served in sauce. Another variation of the dish is soutzoukakia politika, meatballs from Constantinople.

See also 
 Ciorbă de perişoare
 Harput meatballs
 List of meatball dishes
 Sulu köfte
 Tabriz meatballs
 Yuvarlak

References

Greek cuisine
Turkish cuisine
İzmir
Kofta